Kazakh–Turkish relations are foreign relations between Kazakhstan and Turkey. Turkey recognized Kazakhstan on 16 December 1991, being the first state to recognize the independence of Kazakhstan, when Kazakhstan declared its independence. Diplomatic relations between the two countries were established on 2 March 1992. These relations have developed positively on the international stage as well as in commerce and strategic affairs. Kazakhstan has an embassy in Ankara and a consulate general in Istanbul. Turkey has an embassy in Astana and a branch office in Almaty.

As two large nations in Eurasia and sharing the extensive cultural, historical and linguistic heritage of Turkic peoples, both nations have sought to develop closer relations and promote Turkic identity and friendship amongst other Turkic nations in the region. Both Kazakhstan and Turkey are founding members of Organization of Turkic States. The concept of a common Turkic political entity was proposed by Nursultan Nazarbayev, first president of Kazakhstan.

History

Relations between two nations have deep roots, with the first official diplomatic relations beginning between the Kazakh Khanate and the Ottoman Empire in 1713. However, being separated by historical circumstances, the connection with each other had been lost.  In March 1991, the official visit of the President of Turkey Turgut Özal took place at the invitation of Kazakhstan's then-President of the Kazakh Soviet Socialist Republic Nursultan Nazarbayev. This became the first visit of a foreign head of state in the history of Kazakhstan and laid the foundation for relations with Turkey. During that visit, Turkey and Kazakhstan signed an agreement on cooperation in political, trade-economic, scientific-technical, ecological, cultural, social, communication and in other areas. On 15 March, the day after his arrival, he laid flowers at the Glory Memorial in the Park of 28 Panfilov Guardsmen and visited Medeu.

In September 1991, the Presidents Nazarbayev and Özal signed a declaration in Ankara containing the principles and objectives of bilateral relations. President Nursultan Nazarbayev defined during his visit to Turkey the 21st century as the “Turks’ century”. Turkey established diplomatic relations with Kazakhstan following the latter's independence after the dissolution of the Soviet Union. On 2 March 1992, the diplomatic relations were established and in the same year, the embassies of both countries were opened in Kazakhstan and Turkey.

Economic relations
Turkey contributes 2 billion USD in Kazakhstan's total US$50 billion investment volume. Turkey accounts for 1.2% of Kazakhstan's total trade volume and has actively participated in the construction and textile industries of Kazakhstan. In 2005 trade turnover between the countries reached US$556.8 million, showing 13.8% growth from the $500 million level in 2004, and slated to climb to US$1 billion in trade turnover volume in 2006. Turkey hopes to expand investment in Kazakhstan's energy and telecommunications industries. Kazakhstan has increased quotas for the hiring of Turkish workers for construction projects. Kazakhstan is considering the construction of an oil refinery on the Black Sea jointly with Turkey.

Strategic cooperation
In bolstering cooperation over energy resources, Kazakhstan has sought to assert its independence from Russia's influence.  In July 2006, the People's Republic of China, Turkey, Azerbaijan and Georgia gathered in Astana to develop a transport corridor linking Central Asia with the South Caucasus and Western Europe that would increase the annual trade and cargo shipment capacity up to 30 million tons.  Turkey has supported Kazakhstan's bid to join the World Trade Organization while the latter has actively supported Turkey's bid for membership in the European Union.  Both nations have also sought to promote closer cooperation between Turkic nations of Central Asia.

Diplomacy

Republic of Kazakhstan
Ankara (Embassy)
Istanbul (Consulate-General) 
Antalya (Consulate) 

Republic of Turkey
Astana (Embassy)
Almaty (Consulate-General) 
Aktau (Consulate-General)

Ambassadors of Turkey to Kazakhstan 
 Argun Ozpay (1992-1994)
 Mustafa Ashula (1994-1995)
 Kurtulus Tashkent (1995-1999)
 Yavor Aldemir (1999-2004)
 Hakki Taner Seben (2004-2008)
 Atilla Guney (2008-2010)
 Lale Yulker (2010-2012)
 Omer Burkhan Tuzel (2012-2015)
 Nevzat Uyanik (2015-2019)
 Ufuk Ekichi (2020-)

See also 
Foreign relations of Kazakhstan
Foreign relations of Turkey
Turkic Council
Turks in Kazakhstan

References

 
Turkey
Bilateral relations of Turkey